CGU plc was a large insurance group, created by the merger of Commercial Union and General Accident in 1998. The company was listed on the London Stock Exchange.  It merged with Norwich Union in 2000 to form CGNU plc, later renamed Aviva plc.

History 
The company was created by the 1998 merger of Commercial Union and General Accident. It only existed for two years before it merged with Norwich Union in 2000 to form CGNU plc, later renamed Aviva plc.

In the US, the CGU casualty and property businesses were purchased by White Mountains Insurance Group; the name of the company was later changed to OneBeacon Insurance Company.

References 

Aviva
Financial services companies established in 1998
Insurance companies of the United Kingdom
Companies formerly listed on the London Stock Exchange
1998 establishments in the United Kingdom
Financial services companies disestablished in 2000
2000 disestablishments in the United Kingdom